Granville Airport  is a public use airport in Washington County, New York, United States. It is located one nautical mile (1.85 km) north of the central business district of Granville, a village in the Town of Granville.

Facilities and aircraft 
It has one runway designated 16/34 with an asphalt surface measuring 2,500 by 36 feet (762 x 11 m).

For the 12-month period ending August 18, 2005, the airport had 17,000 general aviation aircraft operations, an average of 46 per day. At that time there were 22 aircraft based at this airport: 95.5% single-engine and 4.5% glider.

References

External links 
 Granville Airport (B01) at New York State DOT Airport Directory
 Aerial photo as of May 1994 from USGS The National Map

Airports in New York (state)
Transportation buildings and structures in Washington County, New York